Đông Lỗ may refer to several places in Vietnam, including:

, a rural commune of Ứng Hòa District.
Đông Lỗ, Bắc Giang, a rural commune of Hiệp Hòa District.